This is a list of the butterflies of India belonging to the subfamily Morphinae of the family Nymphalidae and an index to the species articles. This forms part of the full List of butterflies of India (Nymphalidae) which itself forms part of the complete List of butterflies of India.

There are 20 species spanning nine genera which are to be found in Indian limits. However, detailed lepidopterological investigations in the north east of India may locate additional or new species.

Taxa of subfamily Morphinae

Faunis - fauns
 Common faun, Faunis canens Hübner, 1826
 Indian faun, Faunis arcesilaus (Fabricius, 1787). Also considered as conspecific with Faunis carens above. If separate, may be called the Indian faun instead.
 Assam faun, Faunis assama (Westwood, 1858)
 Large faun, Faunis eumeus (Drury, 1773)

Aemona - dryads
 Yellow dryad, Aemona amathusia (Hewitson, 1867)

Stichophthalma - junglequeens
 Northern jungle queen, Stichophthalma camadeva (Westwood, 1848)
 Chocolate jungle queen, Stichophthalma nourmahal (Westwood, 1851)
 Manipur jungle queen, Stichophthalma sparta de Nicéville, 1889

Thaumantis - jungleglories
 Jungle glory, Thaumantis diores Doubleday, 1845

Thauria - jungleking
 Jungleking, Thauria lathyi Frühstorfer, 1902

Amathusia - palmkings
 Palmking, Amathusia phidippus (Linnaeus, 1763)
 Andaman palmking, Amathusia andamanensis Frühstorfer, 1899

Amathuxidia - kohinoor
 Koh-i-noor, Amathuxidia amythaon (Doubleday, 1847)

Discophora - duffers
 Banded duffer, Discophora deo de Nicéville, 1898
 Southern duffer, Discophora lepida (Moore, 1857)
 Common duffer, Discophora sondaica Boisduval, 1836
 Great duffer, Discophora timora Westwood, 1850

Enispe - caliphs
 Blue caliph, Enispe cycnus Westwood, 1851
 Red caliph, Enispe euthymius (Doubleday, 1845)
 Enispe intermedia Rothschild, 1916. A name intermediate caliph is proposed.

See also
Nymphalidae
List of butterflies of India
List of butterflies of India (Nymphalidae)

References

Online
 Savela, Markku's page on subfamily Morphinae (family Nymphalidae). Accessed on 20 May 2007.

Print
 
  
 
 

Morphinae

B